Blondy Rudolph Nna Noukeu (born 17 September 2001) is a Cameroonian professional footballer who plays as a goalkeeper for  club Stoke City.

Early and personal life
Noukeu was born in Douala and grew up in Belgium. He is the son of former professional footballer Patrice Noukeu and his mother was a handball player.

Club career
Noukeu played youth football for Royal Excel Mouscron from under-8 to under-10 level and returned to their academy aged 13. In July 2019, he signed for English side Stoke City, initially joining their under-23 team. In February 2021, he signed a longer-term contract with the club. He joined Crawley Town on a season-long loan on 16 July 2021. He made his professional debut on 10 August 2021 in a EFL Cup match against Gillingham. He was recalled by Stoke on 1 January 2022 after making three cup appearances for Crawley.

On 24 September 2022, Noukeu joined Southend United on loan until January 2023, later extended by a further month to the end of February 2023. He was recalled by Stoke in March 2023.

International career
Having previously been called-up to the Cameroon under-23 team, he was called up to the senior Cameroon squad for the first time in September 2020.

Career statistics

References

External links

2001 births
Living people
Cameroonian footballers
Royal Excel Mouscron players
Stoke City F.C. players
Crawley Town F.C. players
Southend United F.C. players
Association football goalkeepers
Cameroonian expatriate footballers
Cameroonian expatriates in Belgium
Expatriate footballers in Belgium
Cameroonian expatriates in England
Expatriate footballers in England
National League (English football) players